Four-time defending champion Martina Navratilova defeated Hana Mandlíková in the final, 7–6(7–1), 6–3 to win the ladies' singles tennis title at the 1986 Wimbledon Championships. It was her seventh Wimbledon singles title and 14th major singles title overall. Mandlíková was attempting to complete the career Grand Slam.

This marked the first Wimbledon appearance of future champion Jana Novotná. She was defeated by Susan Mascarin in the first round.

Seeds

  Martina Navratilova (champion)
  Chris Evert Lloyd (semifinals)
  Hana Mandlíková (final)
  Claudia Kohde-Kilsch (third round)
  Pam Shriver (first round)
  Kathy Rinaldi (first round)
  Helena Suková (quarterfinals)
  Manuela Maleeva (fourth round)
  Zina Garrison (second round)
  Gabriela Sabatini (semifinals)
  Carling Bassett (fourth round)
  Stephanie Rehe (first round)
  Barbara Potter (withdrew)
  Wendy Turnbull (first round)
  Catarina Lindqvist (quarterfinals)
  Kathy Jordan (fourth round)

Steffi Graf was originally seeded #3 but withdrew due to illness before the tournament draw was made. All original seeds from 4-16 moved up one place, and a new #16 seed was added.

Barbara Potter withdrew due to injury. She was replaced in the draw by lucky loser Ronni Reis.

Qualifying

Draw

Finals

Top half

Section 1

Section 2

Section 3

Section 4

Bottom half

Section 5

Section 6

Section 7

Section 8

References

External links

1986 Wimbledon Championships – Women's draws and results at the International Tennis Federation

Women's Singles
Wimbledon Championship by year – Women's singles
Wimbledon Championships
Wimbledon Championships